Walk the Moon is the second studio album by American rock band Walk the Moon. It was released on June 19, 2012, by RCA Records. The first single, "Anna Sun", peaked at number 10 on the Billboard Alternative chart and number 20 on the Billboard Rock Songs chart.

Track listing

Personnel

Walk the Moon
Nicholas Petricca – lead vocals, keyboards, percussion
Eli Maiman – guitar, backing vocals
Kevin Ray – bass, backing vocals
Sean Waugaman – drums, backing vocals, percussion

Additional musicians
Lindsay Brandt – backing vocals, hand claps, sunshine on "Quesadilla"
Mark Needham – cowboy boots on "Iscariot"
Dustin Chow – additional drum programming on "I Can Lift a Car"

Production
 Producer – Ben Allen
 Mixing – Mark Needham

Charts

References

External links

2012 albums
Walk the Moon albums
RCA Records albums
Albums produced by Ben H. Allen